Larry James Sutton (born May 14, 1970) is an American former professional baseball first baseman. He played in Major League Baseball (MLB) for the Kansas City Royals, Oakland Athletics, St. Louis Cardinals, and Florida Marlins. He also played in the KBO League for the Hyundai Unicorns and Kia Tigers.

Career
Sutton attended Mater Dei High School and the University of Illinois. In , Sutton was the MVP of the Class-A Carolina League, and his team, the Wilmington Blue Rocks won the Carolina League championship. The team featured future major leaguers Johnny Damon and Sal Fasano. In 2000, he hit two home runs in the Triple-A World Series for Memphis against Indianapolis.

In 572 career Major League at-bats, Sutton compiled a .236 batting average.

Sutton played professional baseball in Korea for three seasons, from 2005 to 2007. His best year was 2005, when he hit .292 with 35 home runs and 102 RBI for the Hyundai Unicorns. His home run and RBI totals, as well as his OPS (1.003), led all hitters in the KBO League that year, and he earned a KBO League Golden Glove Award for 2005.

In 2012, Sutton managed the DSL Pirates2.

In October 2019, South Korean baseball club Lotte Giants hired Sutton as their new minor league manager.

References

External links
, or Retrosheet
Korea Baseball Organization
Pelota Binaria (Venezuelan Winter League)

1970 births
Living people
Águilas Cibaeñas players
American expatriate baseball players in the Dominican Republic
Albuquerque Isotopes players
American expatriate baseball players in Canada
American expatriate baseball players in South Korea
Baseball players from California
Edmonton Trappers players
Eugene Emeralds players
Florida Marlins players
Gulf Coast Royals players
Hyundai Unicorns players
Illinois Fighting Illini baseball players
Kansas City Royals players
KBO League first basemen
KBO League left fielders
Kia Tigers players
Major League Baseball first basemen
Major League Baseball outfielders
Memphis Redbirds players
Minor league baseball managers
Navegantes del Magallanes players
American expatriate baseball players in Venezuela
Oakland Athletics players
Omaha Golden Spikes players
Omaha Royals players
Sportspeople from West Covina, California
Rockford Royals players
Sacramento River Cats players
St. Louis Cardinals players
Venados de Mazatlán players
American expatriate baseball players in Mexico
Wichita Wranglers players
Wilmington Blue Rocks players